This is a list of museums in the Province of Sondrio, Lombardy Region, Italy.

Museums and ecomuseums

References

External links 
 Cultural observatory of Lombardy Region

Sondrio
Buildings and structures in the Province of Sondrio
.
Province of Sondrio